Eyal Gabbai (born in 1967 in Jerusalem) was the Director-General of the Israeli Prime Minister's Office from 2009 to 2011. He served as director of the Government Companies Authority and the Israeli branch director of the Australian investment firm Babcock & Brown.

Education and personal life 

Gabbai holds a Bachelor Degree in Economics (magna cum laude) and Law (cum laude), and an MBA in Finance (cum laude) from the Hebrew University of Jerusalem. After completing his undergraduate degree he joined the Israel Democracy Institute and served as an assistant on behalf of the Knesset Economics Committee. Gabbai did his internship at the law firm S. Horowitz and with of Justice Dalia Dorner of the Israel Supreme Court.

He is married to Einat, a clinical psychologist, and is a father to five. His first wife died when their daughter was three-years-old. They live in Modi'in.

Career 

Gabbai's public service career began in 1996, after completing his graduate degree in Business Administration, when he was appointed as the advisor to Justice Minister Tzachi Hanegbi. Gabbai served in that capacity until 1998, when he was appointed by Prime Minister Benjamin Netanyahu to head the economics division of the Prime Minister's Office. After Netanyahu's loss in the May 1999 elections, Gabbi entered the private market, serving as Vice President of Business Development and International Relations at Bezeq International under CEO Uri Yogev from 1999-2001.

In 2002 he returned to public service and was appointed Director of the Government Companies Authority and served there until 2007, under Prime Ministers Ariel Sharon, Ehud Olmert and Benjamin Netanyahu. This period was characterized by vigorous privatization of state companies, including El Al, Bezeq, Israel's Oil Refineries and Zim, selling shares in a total value of 14b NIS in an unprecedented privatization spree. Other changes he instituted included the split-off of Israel Railways from the Ports and Railways Authority and its transformation into a government company, as well as making the Postal Authority and the Government Department of Public Works an auxiliary unit of government companies.

After leaving the Government Companies Authority, Gabbai was appointed director of the Israeli branch of the investment fund Babcock & Brown. The branch had been negotiating to acquire advanced CHIC Company Canadian holdings Franchisee Route 6 throughout the country. The value of Route 6 was estimated at 300-400 million dollars, but at the end of negotiations no business deal was reached. During this time, the global economic crisis broke out and the value of Australian companies had deteriorated as well as the value of its holdings in Israel. In light of the difficult financial situation of the parent company, Gabbai recommended the closure of the Israeli branch, which closed in late 2008. During his role he studied the Israeli branch infrastructure and the tenders participation, Sorek desalination and a solar power plant construction Ashalim. Additionally, he also negotiated the purchase of controlling interest in Gama Management & Clearing, but it was sold to Phoenix Holdings Ltd.

Service in the Israeli Prime Minister’s Office 
Gabbai is very close to Netanyahu in the last 15 years and the relationship between them seems to be founded on mutual appreciation and friendship.

Gabbai was appointed Director-General of the Israeli Prime Minister's Office in May 2009 by the Israeli government. As the most senior representative in the office, he ran all the economic, social and internal affairs of the government on behalf of the prime minister, with special involvement in the energy, infrastructure, water, real estate, and finance sectors.
As such, Gabbai was Netanyahu's designated representative to make decisions about a number of significant socioeconomic issues. The first was the Bank of Israel Law, where a dispute between the Ministry of Finance and the Bank of Israel Governor Prof. Stanley Fischer prevented its submission to the Knesset. Gabbai's formulated intervention was submitted by the government to the Knesset and thus paved the way for approval of law and the extension of Fisher's tenure to a second term. 
A year and a half later Gabbai was again involved in a confrontation with the director of the Finance Ministry, Ilan Levin, about the lawyers' strike. After forty days, Netanyahu decided to intervene and put Gabbai in charge of ending it. Levin refused the outline presented by Gabbai on behalf of the government, and Supreme Court President Dorit Beinish ordered that the conflict be resolved with arbitration. Gabbai’s position was eventually accepted by Beinish. Gabbai's decision, backed Netanyahu, has been criticized for damaging wages and economic repercussions.

Gabbai was also tasked with leading the project of building a natural gas pipeline to Haifa. Due to the concentration of factories in the Haifa district, it was also important to switch over to natural gas and thereby reduce air pollution, morbidity and mortality in the region. The pipeline, together with infrastructure of the Valley Railroad and Highway 6, were designed to pass through the Druze lands in the Kishon Region. Due to internal office differences and contradictory promises given to landowners on - by the ministers, the gas pipeline had been delayed since 2006.

Gabbai was repeatedly appointed by Netanyahu to head teams and committees set up to solve public controversies and find economic solutions. Over the course of his term Gabbai headed dozens of committees dealing with central economic issues such as the reforms in planning and construction, removing obstructions in the Israel Lands Administration, the water crisis, examining the concentration of economic control and the Trajtenberg Committee. Netanyahu took advantage of Gabbai's administrative ability and good nature and let him handle "hot potatoes" that came his way. even when international stories took place, Gabbai was called by Netanyahu to turn down the fire: Netanyahu put out a statement saying he would set up a committee headed by the director-general of his office, Eyal Gabbai, to investigate the unfolding of events, which led to the announcement during US Vice President Joe Biden’s trip of plans to build 1,600 housing units in northeastern Jerusalem during the Biden visit, and come up with regulations to prevent a similar occurrence in the future.

During his work on Gabbai aroused a public storm when he delivered a public speech saying: "'Druze' has become a word that terrifies ministries". Gabbai quickly apologized, but the Druze community demanded his suspension. Despite this, Gabbai continued to formulate a land swap. His solution was received enthusiastically by the Prime Minister and the government, but the Druze withdrew from the agreement.

Business Sector 
After retiring from the PM's Office, Gabbai was appointed as a Chairman of Continuing Education Fund For Teachers Ltd, which has AUM of ~ 18bNIS. Gabbai was appointed by the District Court as Financial Expert in IDB Holding's debt settlement process. Gabbai acted as a very active Expert. He pushed for public tender over IDB, which up till then, was not a common practice under Israeli Law. At the end of the bidding Eduardo Elsztain Group Won and Gabbai was again appointed by the Court, this time, as Trustee for implementation of the Debt Arrangement and the control transfer to the new owner.

References

1967 births
Living people
People from Jerusalem
Israeli civil servants